Darvin George Watson Jr. (born 30 January 1992) is a Caymanian footballer who plays as a forward. He has represented the Cayman Islands during World Cup qualifying matches in 2011.

He started his career at Caymanian side Bodden Town FC in 2008, before joining Cayman Athletic SC for the 2009-10 season.

In August 2010 he moved to the United Kingdom to attend a two-year programme at the FootballCV Academy.

References

Association football forwards
Living people
1992 births
Caymanian footballers
Cayman Islands international footballers
Bodden Town F.C. players
Cayman Athletic SC players